Epirizole (INN) is a nonsteroidal anti-inflammatory drug.

Nonsteroidal anti-inflammatory drugs